Motor Patrol (also known as Highway Patrol) is a 1950 American film directed by Sam Newfield.

Plot
Two Los Angeles Police Department motorcycle officers respond to a report of a traffic accident and find that a pedestrian was killed by a hit-and-run driver. Detectives determine that the incident was related to a stolen car ring. An LAPD academy recruit volunteers for an undercover mission to penetrate the stolen-car ring posing as a car thief from Chicago. Eventually the crooks discover that he is a police officer.

Cast
Don Castle as Ken Foster
Jane Nigh as Connie Taylor
Bill Henry as Larry Collins
Gwen O'Connor as Jean Collins
Onslow Stevens as Lt. Dearborn
Reed Hadley as Robert Flynn
Dick Travis as Bill Hartley
Sid Melton as Omar Shelley
Charles Victor as Russ Garver

References

External links

Motor Patrol at TCMDB
Motor Patrol at BFI

1950 films
American crime thriller films
1950s English-language films
Films directed by Sam Newfield
Lippert Pictures films
1950s crime thriller films
American black-and-white films
1950s American films